Sir J. J. Institute of Applied Art is an Indian applied art institution based in Mumbai. It is a state government college that was started through its sister school, the Sir J. J. School of Art. The "Sir J. J." in the name stands for Sir Jamsetjee Jeejebhoy, a Parsi philanthropist, whose name is linked to numerous historical institutions of Mumbai, such as the Sir J. J. Hospital. The institute is well known for its legacy on Indian design and advertising, as well as its historic campus.

In 1958, Sir J. J. School of Art was divided, with the Departments of Architecture and Applied Art becoming the Sir J. J. College of Architecture and Sir J. J. Institute of Applied Art respectively.

History

Commercial Art Section
The Institute of Applied Art's history first began with the founding of its sister school, the Sir J. J. School of Art, in 1857. Sir J. J. Institute of Applied Art started operations in the premises of the School of Art in 1935 and was awarded an independent institute status in 1961.

In 1946, Sir JJ School of Art started a new department, the Commercial Art Section, or CAS. The objective of this division was to impart all of the necessary training in art with an eye on students being able to exploit this training for commercial purposes.

During the Second World War the school was threatened with closure. At the time the school was run by the British Bombay government and its funding came directly from the government. In preparation for the looming war many committees were set up to review excess government expenditure and divert money to defense needs. The close scrutiny of one such "Thomas Committee" fell on the Sir J. J. School of Art. The committee recommended that the school be shut down, claiming that it only contributed to furthering personal talents of artists and was of no use to society in general.

The director of the J. J. School of Art set out to rectify the situation. In 1935 Mr. Soloman was the dean of J.J. In 1946, J. J. School of Art started a new department, the Commercial Art Section, or CAS. The objective of this division was to impart all of the necessary training in art with an eye on students being able to exploit this training for commercial purposes. A direct contribution of this section was to aid the war preparations of the government by designing propaganda and public awareness posters. This exercise was a huge success. Therefore, the government decided not to shut down the Sir J. J. School of Art. The students trained at the CAS soon found that they were in considerable demand from the commercial industries of Mumbai (then Bombay) to design publicity material. Also, the fledgling advertising industry lapped up talent from the CAS, creating a set of people who would end up being counted among the founders of Indian advertising.

The CAS became popular among applicants to the Sir J. J. School of Art, as it offered a direct means of earning a livelihood to skilled artists who had completed the course. Soon, this once-small section of the school began receiving more student applications than the main part of the institute. At this time India had gained independence. The government, which still ran the school, separated the CAS from the rest of the school and created the Sir J. J. Institute of Applied Art. Professor V. N. Adarkar was named the institutes first principal and later went on to become its first dean.

Later history
The institute's first dean was V. N. Adarkar. Notable deans in recent years have been H. G. Hanmante, Prof. Kamat and M. G. Rajadhyaksha. The current dean of the institute is Dr. Santosh Kshirsagar.

Over the years, Sir J. J. Institute of Applied Art has been involved with several projects on social awareness that include "Know the Five-Year Plan "in the 1950s, "Our Himalayas" during the 1963 Sino-Indian War, and the "International Tourist Fair — Bombay" in 1965.

Present
The current course leads to successful students receiving a Bachelor of Fine Arts (BFA) in Applied Art from the University of Mumbai. The total duration of this course is four years, with the first year referred to as a "Foundation" year, and the later three being referred to as "Specialization" years. A student chooses their area of major specialization from amongst areas such as Illustration, Photography, Typography, Exhibition Design Display and Stagecraft or Computer Graphics.

The Sir J. J. Institute of Applied Art provides more than half of the Indian advertising industry's top art talent. There is a widely held belief among past professors of the institute, as well as art educators, that it would be best for the future health of the institution if the state government grants autonomy to the institute. This would clear the way to a much-needed revamp of the quality of teaching and infrastructure and bring modern day requirements to the school.

The campus is located in South Mumbai (opposite CSMT station) and houses the Sir J. J. Institute of Applied Art, the Sir J. J. School of Art, Sir J. J. College of Architecture, and the Government Institute of Printing Technology. The campus contains many trees that are more than a century old, and houses numerous heritage buildings.

The Kipling connection
The most renowned building on the campus is the century-and-half-old wood and stone bungalow that was Rudyard Kipling's birthplace. An ornate metal plaque at the entrance of this house is engraved with the words, "Rudyard Kipling, son of Lockwood Kipling, first principal of Sir J. J. School of Art, was born here on 30.12.1865." Traditionally, the home of the deans for both the Sir J. J. School of Art and Sir J. J. Institute of Applied Art, this identically-split-bungalow attracts numerous Kipling-enthusiasts from all over the world. For decades now, the Kipling side of the bungalow has been the official Dean's Residence of the dean of Sir J. J. Institute of Applied Art. During the tenure of the last residing dean, Prof. M. G. Rajadhyaksha, a bust of Rudyard Kipling was also unveiled at the entrance to this bungalow as homage to the legendary writer of works such as The Jungle Book and If—.

Notable alumni
Arun Kolatkar – Poet
Prabhakar Barwe – Painter
Prof. R. K. Joshi – renowned calligrapher, designer, type and design academic 
 Nana Patekar – Indian actor and filmmaker
Rajiv Rao – creative head, O&M (creator of Vodafone zoozoos) 
Raj Thackeray – politician and social worker
Uddhav Thackeray – 19th Chief Minister of Maharashtra, politician 
Gopi Kukde – Advertising Genius & the brain behind the 'Onida's Devil'.
Akbar Padamsee
Brendan Pereira, award-winning creative director and designer
Sunil Padwal – Renowned Indian painter
Shivkar Bapuji Talpade – It said that, He is The first Indian to fly an unmanned plane in 1895.
Geetanjali Rao
Ravi Jadhav
Sameer Kulavoor

References

External links
 Official website

University of Mumbai
Art schools in India
Education in Mumbai